Martin Ryan (31 January 1900 – 22 July 1943) was an Irish Fianna Fáil politician. He was first elected as a Fianna Fáil Teachta Dála (TD) for the Tipperary constituency at the 1933 general election. He was re-elected at the 1937, 1938 and 1943 general elections. 

He died while still in office in 1943. No by-election was held for his seat, but his widow Mary Ryan was elected at the 1944 general election for the same constituency.

Martin Ryan's family was involved in Irish nationalism and the GAA, his uncle was Canon Michael Kennedy Ryan. His brother Patrick Ryan fought in the Irish War of Independence and on the Anti-Treaty side of the Irish Civil War, and was also elected as an Anti-Treaty TD in 1923 for Tipperary.

See also
Families in the Oireachtas

References

1900 births
1943 deaths
Fianna Fáil TDs
Irish farmers
Members of the 8th Dáil
Members of the 9th Dáil
Members of the 10th Dáil
Members of the 11th Dáil
Politicians from County Tipperary
Spouses of Irish politicians